"My Main" is a song by American singer Mila J featuring Ty Dolla $ign. It was released on August 27, 2014, as the second single for her debut EP M.I.L.A. (2014).

Music video 
A music video for the song was released on September 30, 2014.

Charts

References 

2014 songs
Mila J songs
2014 singles
Motown singles